Hustad Church is a parish church of the Church of Norway in Hustadvika Municipality in Møre og Romsdal county, Norway. It is located in the village of Hustad along the Hustadvika coast. It is the church for the Hustad parish which is part of the Molde domprosti (arch-deanery) in the Diocese of Møre. The white, wooden church was built in a long church design in 1874 using plans drawn up by the architect Jacob Wilhelm Nordan. The church seats about 400 people.

History
The earliest existing historical records of the church date back to 1589, but that was not the year the church was constructed. The first church in Hustad was a stave church that was likely built in the 12th century.

At some point, the stave church had deteriorated and a new timber-framed church was built next to it. In 1646, records show that both the old and new churches were still standing near each other. The timber-framed church had a cruciform design. At some point, the old stave church was torn down. In 1718, a lightning strike caused the church to burn down and it took 20 years before it was replaced. In 1738, a new cruciform church was built on the same site. The nave of the new building measured . In the 1870s, the church was found to be too small for the congregation, so it was torn down and its materials were auctioned off. The pulpit was sent to the Sandvig Collections (Sandvigske Samlinger) at the Nordic Museum in Maihaugen in Lillehammer. The pulpit was later moved to the Garmo Stave Church.

A new, larger church was built in 1874. The church bell and the brass baptismal font from the old 1738 church were saved and installed in the new church. The new church was designed by Jacob Wilhelm Nordan and it was built by the master carpenter Jacob Digre. The new building was consecrated in 1875.

Media gallery

See also
List of churches in Møre

References

Hustadvika (municipality)
Churches in Møre og Romsdal
Long churches in Norway
Wooden churches in Norway
19th-century Church of Norway church buildings
Churches completed in 1874
12th-century establishments in Norway